Source language may refer to:
Source language (translation), the language a source is translated from
Source code, text written in a computer programming language

See also
Source text
Target language (disambiguation)